Dildo cactus is a common name used for several species of long, narrow cactus, especially

 Acanthocereus tetragonus
 Pilosocereus royenii
 Lava cactus

In addition, Dildo is a common name of Opuntia stricta, and Pilosocereus polygonus is known as the Bahama Dildo.